The Tammy movies are a series of four light-hearted American films about a naive young lady from Mississippi. They were produced by Universal between 1957 and 1967, and based on the character created in Cid Ricketts Sumner's 1948 book Tammy Out of Time.

The main character of the first three films, Tambrey "Tammy" Tyree, is portrayed as a kind and friendly country girl who finds romantic love. Her rustic southern dialect shows her isolation from modern culture, as well as her her rural upbringing but, in the original novel, Tammy Out of Time, Professor Brent discovers that she uses speech expressions going back to Chaucer, and much of her vocabulary is from the Elizabethan era “as is true of some of the mountain folk of Kentucky and Tennessee.”

Tammy and the Bachelor was the basis for the 1965-1966 television series Tammy. In the series Tammy’s last name was Tarleton, and she lives on a houseboat with her grandfather and uncle, but finds work as the secretary of wealthy Mr. Brent. Four episodes of Tammy were reedited into the last Tammy movie, Tammy and the Millionaire.

Film synopsis

Tammy and the Bachelor (1957)

Seventeen-year-old Tammy (Debbie Reynolds) lives on a houseboat with her grandpa (Walter Brennan). One day she comes upon the wreckage of a plane, plus the unconscious pilot, Peter Brent (Leslie Nielsen). Tammy and Grandpa nurse him back to health, and before he leaves for home Peter tells Tammy that if anything happens to her kin she can come and stay with the Brent family. When Grandpa is arrested for making moonshine liquor Tammy  and her pet goat, Nan, go to live at Brentwood Hall. With her rustic upbringing and common-sense Tammy is able to save the aristocratic Brent family from bankruptcy. She and Peter fall in love.

Tammy Tell Me True (1961)

Tammy’s (Sandra Dee) boyfriend, Pete, left for agricultural college but didn’t write to her, so she decides to take classes at a local college. She hoped to rent a room from rich widow Annie Rook Call, (Beulah Bondi) but the lady ends up moving into Tammy’s houseboat, and she remembers living on her uncle’s shanty-boat. Tammy falls in love with one of her teachers, Tom Freeman (John Gavin).

Tammy and the Doctor (1963)

When Mrs. Call (Beulah Bondi) needs medical treatment in California
Tammy (Sandra Dee) goes with her, becomes a nurse’s aide, and is wooed by a doctor (Peter Fonda).

Tammy and the Millionaire (1967)
A re-edit of four half-hour episodes of the Tammy TV series. Tammy Tarleton (Debbie Watson) had been raised on a houseboat by her grandpa (Denver Pyle) and Uncle Lucius (Frank McGrath) before being hired as a secretary for wealthy John Brent (Donald Woods). His neighbor, Lavinia Tate (Dorothy Green) was always trying to make Tammy look bad so that Brent’s son, Steven (Jay Sheffield) will become interested in Mrs. Tate’s daughter. But Mrs. Tate’s plans always backfire, and Tammy ends up impressing Mr. Brent, and winning Steven’s heart.

References

External links